Presidential elections are scheduled to be held in Moldova in autumn 2024.

Electoral system
The President of Moldova is elected using the two-round system; If no candidate receives a majority of the vote in the first round, a second round will be held.

Candidates

Potential
As of February 2022, the following people have been subjects of speculation about their potential candidacy within the previous six months:

Maia Sandu, sixth President of Moldova (2020–present), thirteenth Prime Minister of Moldova (2019)
Igor Dodon, fifth President of Moldova (2016–2020)
Irina Vlah, Governor of Autonomous Territorial Unit of Gagauzia (2015–present)
Natalia Morari, journalist, founder of TV8

Declined 
As of March 2022, the following people have been subjects of speculation about their potential candidacy within the previous six months, but they rejected and announced they won't candidate:

 Ion Ceban, 34th Mayor of Chișinău (2019–present)

Opinion polls

Hypothetical candidates

References 

Moldova
2024 in Moldova
Elections in Moldova